The Chinese Civil War was fought between the Kuomintang-led government of the Republic of China and forces of the Chinese Communist Party, armed conflict continuing intermittently from 1 August 1927 until 7 December 1949, and ending with Communist control of mainland China.

The war is generally divided into two phases with an interlude: from August 1927 to 1937, the KMT-CCP Alliance collapsed during the Northern Expedition, and the Nationalists controlled most of China. From 1937 to 1945, hostilities were mostly put on hold as the Second United Front fought the Japanese invasion of China with eventual help from the Allies of World War II, but even then co-operation between the KMT and CCP was minimal and armed clashes between them were common. Exacerbating the divisions within  China further was that a puppet government, sponsored by Japan and nominally led by Wang Jingwei, was set up to nominally govern the parts of China under Japanese occupation.

The civil war resumed as soon as it became apparent that the Japanese defeat was imminent, and the CCP gained the upper hand in the second phase of the war from 1945 to 1949, generally referred to as the Chinese Communist Revolution.

The Communists gained control of mainland China and established the People's Republic of China in 1949, forcing the leadership of the Republic of China to retreat to the island of Taiwan. Starting in the 1950s, a lasting political and military standoff between the two sides of the Taiwan Strait has ensued, with the ROC in Taiwan and the PRC in mainland China both officially claiming to be the legitimate government of all China. After the Second Taiwan Strait Crisis, both tacitly ceased fire in 1979; however, no armistice or peace treaty has ever been signed.

Background 

Following the collapse of the Qing dynasty and the 1911 Revolution, Sun Yat-sen assumed the presidency of the newly formed Republic of China, and was shortly thereafter succeeded by Yuan Shikai. Yuan was frustrated in a short-lived attempt to restore monarchy in China, and China fell into power struggle after his death in 1916.

The Kuomintang (KMT), led by Sun Yat-sen, created a new government in Guangzhou to rival the warlords who ruled over large swathes of China and prevented the formation of a solid central government. After Sun's efforts to obtain aid from Western countries were ignored, he turned to the Soviet Union. In 1923, Sun and Soviet representative Adolph Joffe in Shanghai pledged Soviet assistance to China's unification in the Sun–Joffe Manifesto, a declaration of cooperation among the Comintern, KMT, and CCP. Comintern agent Mikhail Borodin arrived in 1923 to aid in the reorganization and consolidation of both the CCP and the KMT along the lines of the Communist Party of the Soviet Union. The CCP, which was initially a study group, and the KMT jointly formed the First United Front.

In 1923, Sun sent Chiang Kai-shek, one of his lieutenants, for several months of military and political study in Moscow. Chiang then became the head of the Whampoa Military Academy that trained the next generation of military leaders. The Soviets provided the academy with teaching material, organization, and equipment, including munitions. They also provided education in many of the techniques for mass mobilization. With this aid, Sun raised a dedicated "army of the party," with which he hoped to defeat the warlords militarily. CCP members were also present in the academy, and many of them became instructors, including Zhou Enlai, who was made a political instructor.

Communist members were allowed to join the KMT on an individual basis. The CCP itself was still small at the time, having a membership of 300 in 1922 and only 1,500 by 1925. As of 1923, the KMT had 50,000 members.

However, after Sun died in 1925, the KMT split into left- and right-wing movements. KMT members worried that the Soviets were trying to destroy the KMT from inside using the CCP. The CCP then began movements in opposition of the Northern Expedition, passing a resolution against it at a party meeting.

Then, in March 1927, the KMT held its second party meeting where the Soviets helped pass resolutions against the Expedition and curbing Chiang's power. Soon, the KMT would be clearly divided.

Throughout this time the Soviet Union sent money and spies to support the Chinese Communist Party. Without their support, the communist party likely would have failed. This is evidenced by documents showing of other communist parties in China at the time, one with as many as 10,000 members, but which all failed without support from the Soviet Union.

Shanghai Massacre and Northern Expedition 
In early 1927, the KMT-CCP rivalry led to a split in the revolutionary ranks. The CCP and the left wing of the KMT decided to move the seat of the KMT government from Guangzhou to Wuhan, where communist influence was strong. However, Chiang and Li Zongren, whose armies defeated the warlord Sun Chuanfang, moved eastward toward Jiangxi. The leftists rejected Chiang's demand to eliminate Communist influence within KMT and Chiang denounced them for betraying Sun Yat-sen's Three Principles of the People by taking orders from the Soviet Union. According to Mao Zedong, Chiang's tolerance of the CCP in the KMT camp decreased as his power increased.

On 7 April, Chiang and several other KMT leaders held a meeting, during which they proposed that Communist activities were socially and economically disruptive and had to be undone for the Nationalist revolution to proceed. On 12 April, in Shanghai, many Communist members in the KMT were purged through hundreds of arrests and executions on the orders of General Bai Chongxi. The CCP referred to this as the 12 April Incident, the White Terror or Shanghai Massacre. This incident widened the rift between Chiang and Wang Jingwei, the leader of the left wing faction of the KMT who controlled the city of Wuhan.

Eventually, the left wing of the KMT also expelled CCP members from the Wuhan government, which in turn was toppled by Chiang Kai-shek. The KMT resumed its campaign against warlords and captured Beijing in June 1928. Soon, most of eastern China was under the control of the Nanjing central government, which received prompt international recognition as the sole legitimate government of China. The KMT government announced, in conformity with Sun Yat-sen, the formula for the three stages of revolution: military unification, political tutelage, and constitutional democracy.

Communist insurgency (1927–1937) 

On 1 August 1927, the Communist Party launched an uprising in Nanchang against the Nationalist government in Wuhan. This conflict led to the creation of the Red Army. On 4 August, the main forces of the Red Army left Nanchang and headed southwards for an assault on Guangdong. Nationalist forces quickly reoccupied Nanchang while the remaining members of the CCP in Nanchang went into hiding. A CCP meeting on 7 August confirmed the objective of the party was to seize the political power by force, but the CCP was quickly suppressed the next day on 8 August by the Nationalist government in Wuhan led by Wang Jingwei. On 14 August, Chiang Kai-shek announced his temporary retirement, as the Wuhan faction and Nanjing faction of the Kuomintang were allied once again with common goal of suppressing the Communist Party after the earlier split.

Attempts were later made by the CCP to take the cities of Changsha, Shantou and Guangzhou. The Red Army consisting of mutinous former National Revolutionary Army (NRA) soldiers as well as armed peasants established control over several areas in southern China. KMT forces continued to attempt to suppress the rebellions. Then, in September, Wang Jingwei was forced out of Wuhan. September also saw an unsuccessful armed rural insurrection, known as the Autumn Harvest Uprising, led by Mao Zedong. Borodin then returned to the USSR in October via Mongolia. In November, Chiang Kai-shek went to Shanghai and invited Wang to join him. On 11 December, the CCP started the Guangzhou Uprising, establishing a soviet there the next day, but lost the city by 13 December to a counter-attack under the orders of General Zhang Fakui. On 16 December, Wang Jingwei fled to France. There were now three capitals in China: the internationally recognized republic capital in Beijing, the CCP and left-wing KMT at Wuhan and the right-wing KMT regime at Nanjing, which would remain the KMT capital for the next decade.

This marked the beginning of a ten-year armed struggle, known in mainland China as the "Ten-Year Civil War" (十年内战) which ended with the Xi'an Incident when Chiang Kai-shek was forced to form the Second United Front against invading forces from the Empire of Japan. In 1930 the Central Plains War broke out as an internal conflict of the KMT. It was launched by Feng Yuxiang, Yan Xishan and Wang Jingwei. The attention was turned to root out remaining pockets of Communist activity in a series of five encirclement campaigns. The first and second campaigns failed and the third was aborted due to the Mukden Incident. The fourth campaign (1932–1933) achieved some early successes, but Chiang's armies were badly mauled when they tried to penetrate into the heart of Mao's Soviet Chinese Republic. During these campaigns, KMT columns struck swiftly into Communist areas, but were easily engulfed by the vast countryside and were not able to consolidate their foothold.

Finally, in late 1934, Chiang launched a fifth campaign that involved the systematic encirclement of the Jiangxi Soviet region with fortified blockhouses. The blockhouse strategy was devised and implemented in part by newly hired Nazi advisors.

In October 1934 the CCP took advantage of gaps in the ring of blockhouses (manned by the forces of a warlord ally of Chiang Kai-shek's, rather than regular KMT troops) and broke out of the encirclement. The warlord armies were reluctant to challenge Communist forces for fear of losing their own men and did not pursue the CCP with much fervor. In addition, the main KMT forces were preoccupied with annihilating Zhang Guotao's army, which was much larger than Mao's. The massive military retreat of Communist forces lasted a year and covered what Mao estimated as 12,500 km (25,000 Li); it became known as the Long March.

This military retreat was undertaken by the Chinese Communist Party, led by Mao Zedong, to evade the pursuit or attack of the Kuomintang army. It consisted of a series of marches, during which numerous Communist armies in the south escaped to the north and west. Over the course of the march from Jiangxi the First Front Army, led by an inexperienced military commission, was on the brink of annihilation by Chiang Kai-Shek's troops as their stronghold was in Jiangxi. The Communists, under the command of Mao Zedong and Zhou Enlai, "escaped in a circling retreat to the west and north, which reportedly traversed over 9,000 kilometers over 370 days." The route passed through some of the most difficult terrain of western China by traveling west, and then northwards towards Shaanxi. "In November 1935, shortly after settling in northern Shaanxi, Mao officially took over Zhou Enlai's leading position in the Red Army. Following a major reshuffling of official roles, Mao became the chairman of the Military Commission, with Zhou and Deng Xiaoping as vice-chairmen." This marked Mao's position as the pre-eminent leader of the Party, with Zhou in second position to him.

The march ended when the CCP reached the interior of Shaanxi. Zhang Guotao's army, which took a different route through northwest China, was largely destroyed by the forces of Chiang Kai-shek and his Chinese Muslim allies, the Ma clique. Along the way, the Communist army confiscated property and weapons from local warlords and landlords, while recruiting peasants and the poor, solidifying its appeal to the masses. Of the 90,000–100,000 people who began the Long March from the Soviet Chinese Republic, only around 7,000–8,000 made it to Shaanxi. The remnants of Zhang's forces eventually joined Mao in Shaanxi, but with his army destroyed, Zhang, even as a founding member of the CCP, was never able to challenge Mao's authority. Essentially, the great retreat made Mao the undisputed leader of the Chinese Communist Party.

The Kuomintang used Khampa troops—who were former bandits—to battle the Communist Red Army as it advanced and to undermine local warlords who often refused to fight Communist forces to conserve their own strength. The KMT enlisted 300 "Khampa bandits" into its Consolatory Commission military in Sichuan, where they were part of the effort of the central government to penetrate and destabilize local Han warlords such as Liu Wenhui. The government was seeking to exert full control over frontier areas against the warlords. Liu had refused to battle the Communists in order to conserve his army. The Consolatory Commission forces were used to battle the Red Army, but they were defeated when their religious leader was captured by the Communists.

In 1936, Zhou Enlai and Zhang Xueliang grew closer, with Zhou even suggesting that he join the CCP. However, this was turned down by the Comintern in the USSR. Later on, Zhou persuaded Zhang and Yang Hucheng, another warlord, to instigate the Xi'an Incident. Chiang was placed under house arrest and forced to stop his attacks on the Red Army, instead focusing on the Japanese threat.

Second Sino-Japanese War (1937–1945) 

During Japan's invasion and occupation of Manchuria, Chiang Kai-shek saw the CCP as the greater threat. Chiang refused to ally with the CCP, preferring to unite China by eliminating the warlord and CCP forces first. He believed his forces were too weak to face the Japanese Imperial Army; only after unification could the KMT mobilize against Japan. He ignored the Chinese people's discontent and anger at the KMT policy of compromise with the Japanese, instead ordering KMT generals Zhang Xueliang and Yang Hucheng to suppress the CCP. However, their provincial forces suffered significant casualties in battles with the Red Army.

On 12 December 1936, the disgruntled Zhang and Yang conspired to kidnap Chiang and force him into a truce with the CCP. The incident became known as the Xi'an Incident. Both parties suspended fighting to form a Second United Front to focus their energies and fight the Japanese. In 1937, Japan launched its full-scale invasion of China and its well-equipped troops overran KMT defenders in northern and coastal China.

The alliance of CCP and KMT was in name only. Unlike the KMT forces, CCP troops shunned conventional warfare and instead waged guerrilla warfare against the Japanese. The level of actual cooperation and coordination between the CCP and KMT during World War II was minimal. In the midst of the Second United Front, the CCP and the KMT were still vying for territorial advantage in "Free China" (i.e., areas not occupied by the Japanese or ruled by Japanese puppet governments such as Manchukuo and the Reorganized National Government of China).

The situation came to a head in late 1940 and early 1941 when clashes between Communist and KMT forces intensified. Chiang demanded in December 1940 that the CCP's New Fourth Army evacuate Anhui and Jiangsu Provinces, due to its provocation and harassment of KMT forces in this area. Under intense pressure, the New Fourth Army commanders complied. The following year they were ambushed by KMT forces during their evacuation, which led to several thousand deaths. It also ended the Second United Front, formed earlier to fight the Japanese.

As clashes between the CCP and KMT intensified, countries such as the United States and the Soviet Union attempted to prevent a disastrous civil war. After the New Fourth Army incident, US President Franklin D. Roosevelt sent special envoy Lauchlin Currie to talk with Chiang Kai-shek and KMT party leaders to express their concern regarding the hostility between the two parties, with Currie stating that the only ones to benefit from a civil war would be the Japanese. The Soviet Union, allied more closely with the CCP, sent an imperative telegram to Mao in 1941, warning that civil war would also make the situation easier for the Japanese military. Due to the international community's efforts, there was a temporary and superficial peace. Chiang criticized the CCP in 1943 with the propaganda piece China's Destiny, which questioned the CCP's power after the war, while the CCP strongly opposed Chiang's leadership and referred to his regime as fascist in an attempt to generate a negative public image. Both leaders knew that a deadly battle had begun between themselves.

In general, developments in the Second Sino-Japanese War were to the advantage of the CCP, as its guerrilla war tactics had won them popular support within the Japanese-occupied areas. However, the KMT had to defend the country against the main Japanese campaigns, since it was the legal Chinese government, a factor which proved costly to Chiang Kai-shek and his troops. Japan launched its last major offensive against the KMT, Operation Ichi-Go, in 1944, which resulted in the severe weakening of Chiang's forces. The CCP also suffered fewer losses through its guerrilla tactics. By the end of the war, the Red Army had grown to more than 1.3 million members, with a separate militia of over 2.6 million. About one hundred million people lived in CCP-controlled zones.

Immediate post-war clashes (1945–1946) 

Under the terms of the Japanese unconditional surrender dictated by the Allies, Japanese troops were to surrender to KMT troops but not to the CCP, which was present in some of the occupied areas. In Manchuria, however, where the KMT had no forces, the Japanese surrendered to the Soviet Union. Chiang Kai-shek reminded Japanese troops to remain at their posts to receive the KMT, but Communist forces soon began taking surrenders from the Japanese and fighting those who resisted. General Wedemeyer of the United States Army became alarmed at these developments and wanted seven American divisions to be sent to China, but General Marshall replied that it should not be given priority over Japan and Korea.

The first post-war peace negotiation, attended by both Chiang Kai-shek and Mao Zedong, was in Chongqing from 28 August to 10 October 1945. Chiang entered the meeting at an advantage because he had recently signed a friendly treaty with the Soviet Union while the Communists were still forcing the Japanese to surrender in some places. Mao was accompanied by American ambassador Patrick J. Hurley, who was devoted to Chiang but also wanted to ensure Mao's safety in light of the past history between the two Chinese leaders. It concluded with the signing of the Double Tenth Agreement. Both sides stressed the importance of a peaceful reconstruction, but the conference did not produce any concrete results. Battles between the two sides continued even as peace negotiations were in progress, until the agreement was reached in January 1946. However, large campaigns and full-scale confrontations between the CCP and Chiang's troops were temporarily avoided.

In the last month of World War II in East Asia, Soviet forces launched the huge Manchurian Strategic Offensive Operation against the Japanese Kwantung Army in Manchuria and along the Chinese-Mongolian border. This operation destroyed the Kwantung Army in just three weeks and left the USSR occupying all of Manchuria by the end of the war in a total power vacuum of local Chinese forces. Consequently, the 700,000 Japanese troops stationed in the region surrendered. Later in the year Chiang Kai-shek realized that he lacked the resources to prevent a CCP takeover of Manchuria following the scheduled Soviet departure. He therefore made a deal with the Soviets to delay their withdrawal until he had moved enough of his best-trained men and modern material into the region. However, the Soviets refused permission for the Nationalist troops to traverse its territory and spent the extra time systematically dismantling the extensive Manchurian industrial base (worth up to $2 billion) and shipping it back to their war-ravaged country. KMT troops were then airlifted by the US to occupy key cities in North China, while the countryside was already dominated by the CCP. On 15 November 1945, the KMT began a campaign to prevent the CCP from strengthening its already strong base. At the same time, however, the return of the KMT also brought widespread graft and corruption, with an OSS officer remarking that the only winners were the Communists.

In the winter of 1945–46, Joseph Stalin commanded Marshal Rodion Malinovsky to give Mao Zedong most Imperial Japanese Army weapons that were captured.

Chiang Kai-shek's forces pushed as far as Chinchow (Jinzhou) by 26 November 1945, meeting with little resistance. This was followed by a Communist offensive on the Shandong Peninsula that was largely successful, as all of the peninsula, except what was controlled by the US, fell to the Communists. The truce fell apart in June 1946 when full-scale war between CCP and KMT forces broke out on 26 June 1946. China then entered a state of civil war that lasted more than three years.

Resumed fighting (1946–1949)

Background and disposition of forces 

By the end of the Second Sino-Japanese War, the power of the Communist Party grew considerably. Their main force grew to 1.2 million troops, backed with additional militia of 2 million, totalling 3.2 million troops. Their "Liberated Zone" in 1945 contained 19 base areas, including one-quarter of the country's territory and one-third of its population; this included many important towns and cities. Moreover, the Soviet Union turned over all of its captured Japanese weapons and a substantial amount of their own supplies to the Communists, who received Northeastern China from the Soviets as well.

In March 1946, despite repeated requests from Chiang, the Soviet Red Army under the command of Marshal Rodion Malinovsky continued to delay pulling out of Manchuria, while Malinovsky secretly told the CCP forces to move in behind them, which led to full-scale war for the control of the Northeast. These favorable conditions also facilitated many changes inside the Communist leadership: the more radical hard-line faction who wanted a complete military take-over of China finally gained the upper hand and defeated the careful opportunists. Before giving control to Communist leaders, on 27 March Soviet diplomats requested a joint venture of industrial development with the Nationalist Party in Manchuria.

Although General Marshall stated that he knew of no evidence that the CCP was being supplied by the Soviet Union, the CCP was able to utilize a large number of weapons abandoned by the Japanese, including some tanks. When large numbers of well-trained KMT troops began to defect to the Communist forces, the CCP was finally able to achieve material superiority. The CCP's ultimate trump card was its land reform policy. This drew the massive number of landless and starving peasants in the countryside into the Communist cause. This strategy enabled the CCP to access an almost unlimited supply of manpower for both combat and logistical purposes; despite suffering heavy casualties throughout many of the war's campaigns, manpower continued to grow. For example, during the Huaihai Campaign alone the CCP was able to mobilize 5,430,000 peasants to fight against the KMT forces.

After the war with the Japanese ended, Chiang Kai-shek quickly moved KMT troops to newly liberated areas to prevent Communist forces from receiving the Japanese surrender. The US airlifted many KMT troops from central China to the Northeast (Manchuria). President Harry S. Truman was very clear about what he described as "using the Japanese to hold off the Communists." In his memoirs he writes:

Using the pretext of "receiving the Japanese surrender," business interests within the KMT government occupied most of the banks, factories and commercial properties, which had previously been seized by the Imperial Japanese Army. They also conscripted troops at an accelerated pace from the civilian population and hoarded supplies, preparing for a resumption of war with the Communists. These hasty and harsh preparations caused great hardship for the residents of cities such as Shanghai, where the unemployment rate rose dramatically to 37.5%.

The US strongly supported the Kuomintang forces. About 50,000 US soldiers were sent to guard strategic sites in Hebei and Shandong in Operation Beleaguer. The US equipped and trained KMT troops, and transported Japanese and Koreans back to help KMT forces to occupy liberated zones as well as to contain Communist-controlled areas. According to William Blum, American aid included substantial amounts of mostly surplus military supplies, and loans were made to the KMT. Within less than two years after the Sino-Japanese War, the KMT had received $4.43 billion from the US—most of which was military aid.

Outbreak of war 

As postwar negotiations between the Nationalist government in Nanjing and the Communist Party failed, the civil war between these two parties resumed. This stage of war is referred to in mainland China and Communist historiography as the "War of Liberation". On 20 July 1946, Chiang Kai-shek launched a large-scale assault on Communist territory in North China with 113 brigades (a total of 1.6 million troops). This marked the first stage of the final phase in the Chinese Civil War.

Knowing their disadvantages in manpower and equipment, the CCP executed a "passive defense" strategy. It avoided the strong points of the KMT army and was prepared to abandon territory in order to preserve its forces. In most cases the surrounding countryside and small towns had come under Communist influence long before the cities. The CCP also attempted to wear out the KMT forces as much as possible. This tactic seemed to be successful; after a year, the power balance became more favorable to the CCP. They wiped out 1.12 million KMT troops, while their strength grew to about two million men.

In March 1947 the KMT achieved a symbolic victory by seizing the CCP capital of Yan'an. The Communists counterattacked soon afterwards; on 30 June 1947 CCP troops crossed the Yellow River and moved to the Dabie Mountains area, restored and developed the Central Plain. At the same time, Communist forces also began to counterattack in Northeastern China, North China and East China.

By late 1948, the CCP eventually captured the northern cities of Shenyang and Changchun and seized control of the Northeast after suffering numerous setbacks while trying to take the cities, with the decisive Liaoshen Campaign. The New 1st Army, regarded as the best KMT army, was forced to surrender after the CCP conducted a brutal six-month siege of Changchun that resulted in more than 150,000 civilian deaths from starvation.

The capture of large KMT units provided the CCP with the tanks, heavy artillery and other combined-arms assets needed to execute offensive operations south of the Great Wall. By April 1948 the city of Luoyang fell, cutting the KMT army off from Xi'an. Following a fierce battle, the CCP captured Jinan and Shandong province on 24 September 1948. The Huaihai Campaign of late 1948 and early 1949 secured east-central China for the CCP. The outcome of these encounters were decisive for the military outcome of the civil war.

The Pingjin Campaign resulted in the Communist conquest of northern China. It lasted 64 days, from 21 November 1948 to 31 January 1949. The PLA suffered heavy casualties while securing Zhangjiakou, Tianjin along with its port and garrison at Dagu and Beiping. The CCP brought 890,000 troops from the northeast to oppose some 600,000 KMT troops. There were 40,000 CCP casualties at Zhangjiakou alone. They in turn killed, wounded or captured some 520,000 KMT during the campaign.

After achieving decisive victory at Liaoshen, Huaihai and Pingjin campaigns, the CCP destroyed 144 regular and 29 irregular KMT divisions, including 1.54 million veteran KMT troops, which significantly reduced the strength of Nationalist forces. Stalin initially favored a coalition government in postwar China, and tried to persuade Mao to stop the CCP from crossing the Yangtze and attacking the KMT positions south of the river. Mao rejected Stalin's position and on 21 April, and began the Yangtze River Crossing Campaign. On 23 April they captured the KMT's capital, Nanjing. The KMT government retreated to Canton (Guangzhou) until 15 October, Chongqing until 25 November, and then Chengdu before retreating to Taiwan on 7 December. By late 1949 the People's Liberation Army was pursuing remnants of KMT forces southwards in southern China, and only Tibet was left. A Chinese Muslim Hui cavalry regiment, the 14th Tungan Cavalry, was sent by the Kuomintang to attack Mongol and Soviet positions along the border during the Pei-ta-shan Incident.

The Kuomintang made several last-ditch attempts to use Khampa troops against the Communists in southwest China. The Kuomintang formulated a plan in which three Khampa divisions would be assisted by the Panchen Lama to oppose the Communists. Kuomintang intelligence reported that some Tibetan tusi chiefs and the Khampa Su Yonghe controlled 80,000 troops in Sichuan, Qinghai and Tibet. They hoped to use them against the Communist army.

Pushing south 

On 1 October 1949, Mao Zedong proclaimed the founding of the People's Republic of China with its capital at Beiping, which was returned to the former name Beijing. Chiang Kai-shek and approximately two million Nationalist soldiers retreated from mainland China to the island of Taiwan in December after the PLA advanced into the Sichuan province. Isolated Nationalist pockets of resistance remained in the area, but the majority of the resistance collapsed after the fall of Chengdu on 10 December 1949, with some resistance continuing in the far south.

A PRC attempt to take the ROC-controlled island of Quemoy was thwarted in the Battle of Kuningtou, halting the PLA advance towards Taiwan. In December 1949, Chiang proclaimed Taipei the temporary capital of the Republic of China and continued to assert his government as the sole legitimate authority in China.

The Communists' other amphibious operations of 1950 were more successful: they led to the Communist conquest of Hainan Island in April 1950, capture of Wanshan Islands off the Guangdong coast (May–August 1950), Zhoushan Island off Zhejiang (May 1950).

Aftermath and unsolved issues (1949–present)

Most observers expected Chiang's government to eventually fall to the imminent invasion of Taiwan by the People's Liberation Army, and the US was initially reluctant in offering full support for Chiang in their final stand. US President Harry S. Truman announced on 5 January 1950 that the United States would not engage in any dispute involving the Taiwan Strait, and that he would not intervene in the event of an attack by the PRC. Truman, seeking to exploit the possibility of a Titoist-style Sino-Soviet split, announced in his United States Policy toward Formosa that the US would obey the Cairo Declaration's designation of Taiwan as Chinese territory and would not assist the Nationalists. However, the Communist leadership was not aware of this change of policy, instead becoming increasingly hostile to the US. The situation quickly changed after the sudden onset of the Korean War in June 1950. This led to changing political climate in the US, and President Truman ordered the United States Seventh Fleet to sail to the Taiwan Strait as part of the containment policy against potential Communist advance.

In June 1949 the ROC declared a "closure" of all mainland China ports and its navy attempted to intercept all foreign ships. The closure was from a point north of the mouth of Min River in Fujian to the mouth of the Liao River in Liaoning. Since mainland China's railroad network was underdeveloped, north–south trade depended heavily on sea lanes. ROC naval activity also caused severe hardship for mainland China fishermen.

During the retreat of the Republic of China to Taiwan, KMT troops, who couldn't retreat to Taiwan, were left behind and allied with local bandits to fight a guerrilla war against the Communists. These KMT remnants were eliminated in the Campaign to Suppress Counterrevolutionaries and the Campaigns to Suppress Bandits. According to official statistics from the CCP in 1954, during the Campaign to Suppress Counterrevolutionaries, at least 2.6 million people were arrested, some 1.29 million people were imprisoned, and 712,000 people were executed. Most of those killed were former Kuomintang officials, businessmen, former employees of Western companies and intellectuals whose loyalty was suspect.

Winning China proper in 1950, also after Annexation of Tibet, the CCP controlled the entire mainland in late 1951 (excluding Kinmen and Matsu Islands). But a group of approximately 3,000 KMT Central soldiers retreated to Burma and continued launching guerrilla attacks into south China during the Kuomintang Islamic Insurgency in China (1950–1958) and Campaign at the China–Burma Border. Their leader, Li Mi, was paid a salary by the ROC government and given the nominal title of Governor of Yunnan. Initially, the US-supported these remnants and the Central Intelligence Agency provided them with military aid. After the Burmese government appealed to the United Nations in 1953, the US began pressuring the ROC to withdraw its loyalists. By the end of 1954 nearly 6,000 soldiers had left Burma and Li declared his army disbanded. However, thousands remained, and the ROC continued to supply and command them, even secretly supplying reinforcements at times to maintain a base close to China.

After the ROC complained to the United Nations against the Soviet Union for violating the Sino-Soviet Treaty of Friendship and Alliance to support the CCP, the UN General Assembly Resolution 505 was adopted on 1 February 1952, condemning the Soviet Union.

In the end, the Communist military forces suffered 1.3 million combat casualties in the 1945–1949 phase of the war: 260,000 killed, 190,000 missing, and 850,000 wounded, discounting irregulars. Nationalist casualties in the same phase were recorded after the war by the PRC 5,452,700 regulars and 2,258,800 irregulars.

Taiwan Strait Tensions
Though viewed as a military liability by the US, the ROC viewed its remaining islands in Fujian as vital for any future campaign to defeat the PRC and retake mainland China. On 3 September 1954, the First Taiwan Strait Crisis began when the PLA started shelling Kinmen and threatened to take the Dachen Islands in Zhejiang. On 20 January 1955, the PLA took nearby Yijiangshan Island, with the entire ROC garrison of 720 troops killed or wounded defending the island. On 24 January of the same year, the United States Congress passed the Formosa Resolution authorizing the President to defend the ROC's offshore islands. The First Taiwan Straits crisis ended in March 1955 when the PLA ceased its bombardment. The crisis was brought to a close during the Bandung conference.

The Second Taiwan Strait Crisis began on 23 August 1958 with air and naval engagements between PRC and ROC forces, leading to intense artillery bombardment of Quemoy (by the PRC) and Amoy (by the ROC), and ended on November of the same year. PLA patrol boats blockaded the islands from ROC supply ships. Though the US rejected Chiang Kai-shek's proposal to bomb mainland China artillery batteries, it quickly moved to supply fighter jets and anti-aircraft missiles to the ROC. It also provided amphibious assault ships to land supplies, as a sunken ROC naval vessel was blocking the harbor. On 7 September the US escorted a convoy of ROC supply ships and the PRC refrained from firing.

The third crisis occurred in 1995–96. The PLA responded to Taiwanese President Lee Teng-hui's visit to the United States, and the U.S. recognition of Lee as a representative of Taiwan with military exercises. PLA actions were also meant to deter Taiwanese voters from supporting Lee in the 1996 election. The U.S. deployed two aircraft carriers in response to the PLA's actions and Lee won the election. The carriers were not attacked and deescalation followed.

U.S. speaker Nancy Pelosi's visit to Taiwan in August 2022 triggered the PLA to cause military exercises across the Taiwan Strait. She originally intended to travel to Taiwan in April 2022, but was delayed due to COVID-19. She rescheduled the trip to August as part of a wider Asian trip. The White House was reported to have been initially divided over the appropriateness of the trip but later affirmed Pelosi's right to visit Taiwan. As a result, the PLA announced four days of unprecedented military live-fire drills, in six zones that encircle the island on the busiest international waterways and aviation routes. In response to the announcement, ROC officials complained that the PLA's live-fire drills were an invasion of Taiwan's territorial space and a direct challenge to free air and sea navigation.

Political fallout 

On 25 October 1971, the United Nations General Assembly admitted the PRC and expelled the ROC, which had been a founding member of the United Nations and was one of the five permanent members of the Security Council. Representatives of Chiang Kai-shek refused to recognise their accreditations as representatives of China and left the assembly. Recognition for the People's Republic of China soon followed from most other member nations, including the United States.

By 1984 PRC and ROC began to de-escalate their hostilities through diplomatic relations with each other, and cross-straits trade and investment has been growing ever since. The state of war was officially declared over by the ROC in 1991. Despite the end of the hostilities, the two sides have never signed any agreement or treaty to officially end the war. According to Mao Zedong, there were three ways of "staving off imperialist intervention in the short term" during the continuation of the Chinese Revolution. The first was through a rapid completion of the military takeover of the country, and through showing determination and strength against "foreign attempts at challenging the new regime along its borders." The second was by "formalising a comprehensive military alliance with the Soviet Union," which would dedicate Soviet power to directly defending China against its enemies; this aspect became extensively significant given the backdrop of the start of the Cold War. And finally the regime had to "root out its domestic opponents : the heads of secret societies, religious sects, independent unions, or tribal and ethnic organisations." By destroying the basis of domestic reaction, Mao believed a safer world for the Chinese revolution to spread in would come into existence.

Under the new ROC president Lee Teng-hui, the Temporary Provisions Effective During the Period of Communist Rebellion was renounced in May 1991, thus ending the chances of the Kuomintang's quest to retake the mainland. In July 1999, Lee announced a "special diplomatic relationship". China was furious again, but the military drills were stopped by the 921 earthquakes. It was the last tense moment of this civil war.

With the election in 2000 of Democratic Progressive Party candidate Chen Shui-bian, a party other than the KMT gained the presidency for the first time in Taiwan. The new president did not share the Chinese nationalist ideology of the KMT and CCP. This led to tension between the two sides, although trade and other ties such as the 2005 Pan-Blue visit continued to increase.

With the election of Pro-mainland President Ma Ying-jeou (KMT) in 2008, significant warming of relations resumed between Taipei and Beijing, with high-level exchanges between the semi-official diplomatic organizations of both states such as the Chen-Chiang summit series. Although the Taiwan Strait remains a potential flash point, regular direct air links were established in 2009.

Reasons for the Communist victory 
The historian Rana Mitter concluded that the Nationalist government in 1945 had been "fundamentally destroyed by the war with Japan." Mitter writes that a lack of trust in the Nationalist government developed, as it was increasingly seen as "corrupt, vindictive, and with no overall vision of what China under its rule should look like."

Historian Odd Arne Westad says the Communists won the Civil War because they made fewer military mistakes than Chiang Kai-shek and also because in his search for a powerful centralized government, Chiang antagonized too many interest groups in China. Furthermore, his party was weakened in the war against the Japanese. Meanwhile, the Communists targeted different groups, such as peasants, and brought them to their side.

Chiang wrote in his diary in June 1948: "After the fall of Kaifeng our conditions worsened and became more serious. I now realized that the main reason our nation has collapsed, time after time throughout our history, was not because of superior power used by our external enemies, but because of disintegration and rot from within."

The better-trained Communist army was also able to receive support from the USSR, which helped to counter the American aid that the Nationalists received. Chen Yun said: "They did their best to help us, we were backed by the Soviet Union and North Korea."

Strong American support for the Nationalists was hedged with the failure of the Marshall Mission, and then stopped completely mainly because of KMT corruption (such as the notorious Yangtze Development Corporation controlled by H.H. Kung and T. V. Soong's family) and KMT's military setback in Northeast China.

The main advantage of the Chinese Communist Party was the "extraordinary cohesion" within the top level of its leadership. These skills were not only secured from defections that came about during difficult times but also coupled with "communications and top level debates over tactics." The charismatic style of leadership of Mao Zedong created a "unity of purpose" and a "unity of command" which the KMT lacked. Apart from that the CCP had mastered the manipulation of local politics to their benefit; this was also derived from their propaganda skills that had also been decentralised successfully. By "portraying their opponents as enemies of all groups of Chinese" and itself as "defenders of the nation" and people (given the backdrop of the war with Japan).

In the Chinese Civil War after 1945, the economy in the ROC areas collapsed because of hyperinflation and the failure of price controls by the ROC government and financial reforms; the Gold Yuan devaluated sharply in late 1948 and resulted in the ROC government losing the support of the cities' middle classes.  In the meantime, the Communists continued their relentless land reform (land redistribution) programs to win the support of the population in the countryside.

Historians such as Jay Taylor and Robert Cowley, and Anne W. Carroll argue that the nationalists’ failure was largely caused by external reasons outside of the KMT's control, most notably, the refusal of the Truman administration to support Chiang with the withdrawal of aid, US armed embargo, the failed pursuit of a détente between the nationalists and the communists, and the USSR's consistent support of the CPC in the Chinese Civil War.

Atrocities 
During the war both the Nationalists and Communists carried out mass atrocities, with millions of non-combatants deliberately killed by both sides. Benjamin Valentino has estimated atrocities in the Chinese Civil War resulted in the death of between 1.8 million and 3.5 million people between 1927 and 1949.

Nationalist atrocities 
Over several years after the 1927 Shanghai massacre, the Kuomintang killed between 300,000 and one million people, primarily peasants, in anti-communist campaigns as part of the White Terror. During the White Terror, the Nationalists specifically targeted women with short hair who had not been subjected to foot binding, on the presumption that such "non-traditional" women were radicals. Nationalist forces cut off their breasts, shaved their heads, and displayed their mutilated bodies to intimidate the populace.

From 1946 to 1949, the Nationalists arrested, tortured, and killed political dissidents via the Sino-American Cooperative Organization.

Communist atrocities

During the December 1930 Futian incident, the communists executed 2,000 to 3,000 members of the Futian battalion after its leaders had mutinied against Mao Zedong.

Between 1931 and 1934 in the Jiangxi–Fujian Soviet, the communist authorities engaged in a widespread campaign of violence against civilians to ensure compliance with its policies and to stop defection to the advancing KMT, including mass executions, land confiscation and forced labor. According to Li Weihan, a high-ranking communist in Jiangxi at the time, in response to mass flight of civilians to KMT held areas, the local authorities authorities would "usually to send armed squads after those attempting to flee and kill them on the spot, producing numerous mass graves throughout the CSR [Chinese Soviet Republic in Jiangxi] that would later be uncovered by the KMT and its allies." Zhang Wentian, another high-ranking communist, reported that "the policy of annihilating landlords as an exploiting class had degenerated into a massacre" The population of the communist controlled area fell by 700,000 from 1931 and 1935, of which a large proportion were murdered as “class enemies,” worked to death, committed suicide, or died in other circumstances attributable to the communists.

During the Siege of Changchun the People's Liberation Army implemented a military blockade on the KMT-held city of Changchun and prevented civilians from leaving the city during the blockade; this blockade caused the starvation of tens to 150 thousand civilians. The PLA continued to use siege tactics throughout Northeast China.

At the outbreak of the Chinese Civil War in 1946, Mao Zedong began to push for a return to radical policies to mobilize China against the landlord class, but protected the rights of middle peasants and specified that rich peasants were not landlords. The 7 July Directive of 1946 set off eighteen months of fierce conflict in which all rich peasant and landlord property of all types was to be confiscated and redistributed to poor peasants. Party work teams went quickly from village to village and divided the population into landlords, rich, middle, poor, and landless peasants. Because the work teams did not involve villagers in the process, however, rich and middle peasants quickly returned to power.  The Outline Land Law of October 1947 increased the pressure. Those condemned as landlords were buried alive, dismembered, strangled and shot.
In response to the aforementioned land reform campaign; the Kuomintang helped establish the "Huanxiang Tuan", or Homecoming Legion, which was composed of landlords who sought the return of their redistributed land and property from peasants and CCP guerrillas, as well as forcibly conscripted peasants and communist POWs. The Homecoming legion conducted its guerrilla warfare campaign against CCP forces and purported collaborators up until the end of the civil war in 1949.

See also 

 List of wars involving the People's Republic of China
 Campaign to suppress bandits in northeast China
 Campaign to Suppress Bandits in Wuping
 Campaign to suppress bandits in southwestern China
 Campaign to Suppress Bandits in Eastern China

References

Further reading 
 Cheng, Victor Shiu Chiang. "Imagining China's Madrid in Manchuria: The Communist Military Strategy at the Onset of the Chinese Civil War, 1945–1946." Modern China 31.1 (2005): 72–114.
 Chi, Hsi-sheng. Nationalist China at War: Military Defeats and Political Collapse, 1937–45 (U of Michigan Press, 1982).
 Dreyer, Edward L. China at War 1901–1949 (Routledge, 2014).
 Dupuy, Trevor N. The Military History of the Chinese Civil War (Franklin Watts, Inc., 1969).
 Eastman, Lloyd E. "Who lost China? Chiang Kai-shek testifies." China Quarterly 88 (1981): 658–668.
 Eastman, Lloyd E., et al. The Nationalist Era in China, 1927–1949 (Cambridge UP, 1991).
 Fenby, Jonathan. Generalissimo: Chiang Kai-shek and the China He Lost (2003).
 Ferlanti, Federica. "The New Life Movement at War: Wartime Mobilisation and State Control in Chongqing and Chengdu, 1938—1942" European Journal of East Asian Studies 11#2 (2012), pp. 187–212 online how Nationalist forces mobilized society
 Jian, Chen. "The Myth of America's “Lost Chance” in China: A Chinese Perspective in Light of New Evidence." Diplomatic History 21.1 (1997): 77–86.
 Lary, Diana. China's Civil War: A Social History, 1945–1949 (Cambridge UP, 2015).  excerpt
 Levine, Steven I. "A new look at American mediation in the Chinese civil war: the Marshall mission and Manchuria." Diplomatic History 3.4 (1979): 349–376.
 Lew, Christopher R. The Third Chinese Revolutionary Civil War, 1945–49: An Analysis of Communist Strategy and Leadership (Routledge, 2009).
 Li, Xiaobing. China at War: An Encyclopedia (ABC-CLIO, 2012).
 Lynch, Michael. The Chinese Civil War 1945–49 (Bloomsbury Publishing, 2014).
 Mitter, Rana. "Research Note Changed by War: The Changing Historiography Of Wartime China and New Interpretations Of Modern Chinese History." Chinese Historical Review 17.1 (2010): 85–95.
 Nasca, David S. Western Influence on the Chinese National Revolutionary Army from 1925 to 1937. (Marine Corps Command And Staff Coll Quantico Va, 2013). online
 Pepper, Suzanne. Civil war in China: the political struggle 1945–1949 (Rowman & Littlefield, 1999).
 Reilly, Major Thomas P. Mao Tse-Tung And Operational Art During The Chinese Civil War (Pickle Partners Publishing, 2015) online.
 Shen, Zhihua, and Yafeng Xia. Mao and the Sino–Soviet Partnership, 1945–1959: A New History. (Lexington Books, 2015).
 , advanced military history.  excerpt
 Taylor, Jeremy E., and Grace C. Huang. "'Deep changes in interpretive currents'? Chiang Kai-shek studies in the post-cold war era." International Journal of Asian Studies 9.1 (2012): 99–121.
 Taylor, Jay. The Generalissimo (Harvard University Press, 2009). biography of Chiang Kai-shek
 .
 
 Yick, Joseph K.S. Making Urban Revolution in China: The CCP-GMD Struggle for Beiping-Tianjin, 1945–49 (Routledge, 2015).

External links 

 Summary of Chinese Civil War 1946–1949
 "Armored Car Like Oil Tanker Used by Chinese" Popular Mechanics, March 1930 article and photo of armoured train of Chinese Civil War
 Topographic maps of China Series L500, U.S. Army Map Service, 1954–
 Operational Art in the Chinese PLA's Huai Hai Campaign
 Postal Stamps of the Chinese Post-Civil War Era

Chinese Civil War
Revolutions in China
Wars involving the Republic of China
Wars involving the People's Republic of China
Interwar period
Revolution-based civil wars
Communism-based civil wars
Wars of independence
Aftermath of World War II
Military history of the Republic of China (1912–1949)
Proxy wars
20th-century conflicts
Cross-Strait conflict